Harald Nikolai Brøvig (18 July 1917 – 28 February 2010) was a Norwegian politician for the Conservative Party.

He served as a deputy representative to the Parliament of Norway from Vest-Agder during the terms 1958–1961, and 1965–1969.

He lives in Farsund, and has a fortune of about US$2.1 million.

References

1917 births
2010 deaths
Deputy members of the Storting
Conservative Party (Norway) politicians
Vest-Agder politicians
People from Farsund